Igor Shukhovtsev (born 13 July 1971) is a professional Ukrainian football goalkeeper and manager.

Shukhovtsev holds anti-record for the number of goals allowed in the Ukrainian Premier League/Higher League with 493.

Career
He played for Metalist Kharkiv in the Ukrainian Premier League. He is also a former goalkeeping coach in the Kazakh club FC Tobol.

References

External links

Profile on Official Illychivets Website

1971 births
Living people
Soviet footballers
Ukrainian footballers
Association football goalkeepers
Ukrainian Premier League players
SC Odesa players
FC Ural Yekaterinburg players
Russian Premier League players
Ukrainian expatriate footballers
Expatriate footballers in Russia
FC Mariupol players
FC Illichivets-2 Mariupol players
FC Arsenal Kyiv players
FC Podillya Khmelnytskyi players
SC Tavriya Simferopol players
FC Zorya Luhansk players
FC Metalist Kharkiv players
Ukrainian football managers
FC Nyva Vinnytsia players
FC Balkany Zorya players
Footballers from Odesa
Ukrainian expatriate sportspeople in Russia
Ukrainian expatriate sportspeople in Kazakhstan